There are at least 28 named lakes and reservoirs in Perry County, Arkansas.

Lakes
Bull Lake, el.  
Bull Lake Slough, el.  
Clear Lake, el.  
 Open Lake, el.  
 Winford Brake, el.

Reservoirs
Big Fish Pond, el.  
Clear Water Lake, el.  
Cove Creek Lake, el.  
Darby's Pond, el.  
Deltic Farms Lake, el.  
Francis Lake, el.  
Harris Brake, el.  
Harris Brake Public Fishing Lake, el.  
Henry Lake, el.  
Jones Lake Number Two, el.  
Lake Sylvia, el.  
Ouachita Creek Watershed Site One Reservoir, el.  
Ouachita Creek Watershed Site Three Reservoir, el.  
Ouachita Creek Watershed Site Two Reservoir, el.  
Owens Lake, el.  
Rock Creek Lake, el.  
South Fouche Site Seven Reservoir, el.  
South Fouche Site Six Reservoir, el.  
South Fourche Site One Reservoir, el.  
The Campbells Lake, el.  
Van Dalsen Lake, el.  
Willenberg Lake, el.  
Womack Lake, el.

See also
 List of lakes in Arkansas

Notes

Bodies of water of Perry County, Arkansas
Perry